The 1914 Birmingham West by-election was held on 14 July 1914. The by-election was held due to the death of the incumbent Conservative MP, Joseph Chamberlain. It was won by his son the Conservative candidate Austen Chamberlain, who was elected unopposed. Austen had resigned as MP for East Worcestershire in order to stand in Birmingham West, prompting a by-election in that constituency as well, which was held two days later.

References

1914 elections in the United Kingdom
1914 in England
1910s in Birmingham, West Midlands
July 1914 events
West, 1914
Unopposed by-elections to the Parliament of the United Kingdom (need citation)